Cristhian Hernández (born October 30, 1993) is a Mexican footballer.

Career

High School, Youth and Amateur
Hernández attended Saint Benedict's Preparatory School in New Jersey.  In 2011, he led Saint Benedict's Prep to a 24-0 record, a number one ranking and the school's seventh national championship in 2011.  He was named to the NJ Star-Ledger’s All-Prep First Team, ESPN High School All-New Jersey State and a top 10 soccer recruit in the nation.

Hernández also spent some time in the U.S. Soccer Development Academy.  In 2008–09, he made 24 appearances for the LA Galaxy U15/U16 squad and scored five goals.  In 2010, Hernández joined the Players Development Academy (PDA), a Youth Development Affiliate of the Philadelphia Union, and scored 16 goals in 26 appearances for the club on his way to winning USDA U-18 Academy Player of The Year.

Hernández also made one appearance for USL Premier Development League club Central Jersey Spartans in 2011.

Professional
On March 5, 2012, Hernández signed with the Philadelphia Union as the club's third homegrown player.  He made his debut for the club about a couple weeks later, coming on as a sub in a 2-1 home loss to the Colorado Rapids. After failing to make the 2012  MLS Cup Playoffs, Hernández joined La Liga side Real Sociedad for a training stint during the MLS off-season.

On 15 April 2014, Hernández signed for New York Cosmos B.

Career statistics

Club

Updated June 23, 2013

References

External links
 
 

1993 births
Living people
Mexican expatriate footballers
Mexican footballers
Central Jersey Spartans players
Philadelphia Union players
Penn FC players
New York Cosmos B players
Las Vegas Lights FC players
Association football forwards
Expatriate soccer players in the United States
USL League Two players
Major League Soccer players
USL Championship players
Mexican expatriate sportspeople in the United States
Philadelphia Fury players
Homegrown Players (MLS)